Gate is a 2018 South Korean crime comedy film directed by Shin Jai-ho.

Cast
 Jung Ryeo-won as So-eun 
 Im Chang-jung as Gyu-cheol 
 Jung Sang-hoon as Min-wook
 Lee Geung-young as Jang-choon 
 Lee Moon-sik as Cheol-soo 
 Kim Do-hoon as Won-ho 
 Sunwoo Eun-sook as Ok-ja
 Jung Kyung-soon as Ae-ri 
 Kim Bo-min as Mi-ae 
 Lim Chul-hyung as Eun-tak 
 Ko Dong-ok as Kwang-ho 
 Kim Hyo-min as Nam-ho
 Han Yi-jin as Dong-goo
 Yun Song-a as Kim Won-jang (special appearance)
 Choi Yun-seul as Announcer (special appearance)

Background
The film was reportedly inspired by the Choi Soon-sil political affair, which erupted in end-2016.

References

External links

Gate at the Korean Movie Database 
Gate at Naver Movies 

2018 films
South Korean crime comedy films
2010s heist films
2018 comedy films
2010s crime comedy films
2010s satirical films
Films directed by Shin Jai-ho
South Korean heist films
2018 crime films
2010s South Korean films